Wulfgar, son of Beornegar, is the barbarian hero of Icewind Dale in the Forgotten Realms campaign setting, and one of the Companions of the Hall along with Drizzt Do'Urden, Catti-brie, Regis the halfling, and Bruenor Battlehammer. He is the creation of R.A. Salvatore.

Wulfgar was originally planned to be the protagonist of Salvatore's first novel series, The Icewind Dale Trilogy, which was initially to be set in the Moonshae Isles. As soon as the background was changed to Icewind Dale, Drizzt Do'Urden was invented as Wulfgar's sidekick, and succeeded him as the protagonist in following novels. Wulfgar returned to the major role in the novel The Spine of the World.

Appearance
Wulfgar is broad-shouldered and thick-chested with a wiry waist, and his arms have been described as thicker than a fat dwarf's thighs. Despite his bulk, he's moderately graceful. He's also relatively young and has a boyish face, and eventually grew a beard. Tanja Monique Bruske-Guth sees Wulfgar's description in the novel as how the abstract attributes of a game character can be visualized and explained.

Wulfgar has incredible strength for even his barbarian race. For instance, Wulfgar once pulled the prow of an entire ship out of the water, and once lifted a three-hundred-pound man with one arm, and then threw him through the tavern where the bar fight had begun. Also, when he challenged King Heafstaag, a mighty barbarian leader in Icewind Dale, Wulfgar literally crushed the King's head like a melon with his bare hands. Wulfgar managed to resist Heaftaag's spine shattering bear hug as he did so. He also used a large, irritable camel as a projectile weapon to defeat a gang of bandits in The Halfling's Gem, and escaped a flesh golem, Bok, that was slowly bear-hugging him to death by tearing off its head with his bare hands. Wulfgar would routinely take on foes much bigger than he and defeat them with his strength and mighty warhammer.

Biography

Early years
As a youth, Wulfgar was the flag bearer for Heafstaag, king of the Elk Tribe. He participated in barbarian invasion of Ten-Towns, where Bruenor Battlehammer, a dwarf, knocked Wulfgar out by sweeping his legs out from under him. After the battle, when the people of Ten-towns were slitting throats of the barbarians not quite dead, Bruenor spared Wulfgar. Instead of death, Bruenor sentenced Wulfgar to five years and a day of service to Bruenor. Wulfgar took to the forge and, over time, changed his opinion of Bruenor from a slaver to a father. Bruenor crafted the legendary warhammer Aegis-fang as a gift for Wulfgar. When Wulfgar's sentence was almost up, Bruenor bade Drizzt Do'Urden, a drow, to teach Wulfgar how to fight.

Wulfgar took up the task of killing the white dragon Icingdeath (Ingeloakastimizilian) in order to gain credibility, take leadership of his tribe and restore their glory. With the help of Drizzt, Wulfgar challenged and killed the dragon, earning the title Dragonsbane. It was in the Dragon's lair that Drizzt found his scimitar named Icingdeath, with the power to repel flames. The dragon killing scene was criticized by some Dungeons & Dragons fans for violating the game rules, as both characters were of supposedly low level. Salvatore was quoted replying: "I'll let the poor game designers fret about the proper levels for characters. I just write stories."

With this deed to his credit, he was able to challenge King Heafstaag to combat for leadership of the tribes. Wulfgar defeated Heafstaag, gaining rulership of the Tribe of the Elk, and led the tribes to the aid of the people of Ten-Towns. He also fell in love with Catti-brie, Bruenor's adopted human daughter.

Wulfgar followed Bruenor and Drizzt in their campaign for Mithral Hall and struggle against assassin Artemis Entreri. After Mithral Hall was conquered, Wulfgar resided there. His barbarian attitude, chauvinism and jealousy led to rift between Catti-brie, Drizzt, and himself. He also became hostile towards Drizzt and Cattie-brie after being informed by Regis (who was really Artemis Entreri) and the ruby that Cattie-brie was being unfaithful to him with Drizzt. This led to him attacking Drizzt once in Mithral Hall then backing off when he was reminded Drizzt was a friend. Even after Regis was revealed to be Entreri, Wulfgar was still bitter to Cattie-brie leading to a tongue lashing from Bruenor. He and Cattie-brie partially made up after that. When a drow party from Menzoberranzan captured Drizzt, though, Wulfgar followed his friends to rescue. In the battle with a yochlol, Wulfgar caused a ceiling to cave in on himself, and the handmaiden, in order to keep it from killing Cattie-brie. His companions believed he was dead.

After resurrection 
Wulfgar's death received mixed reception and affected some Forgotten Realms fans. It led to debate between author and TSR, Inc. publishing house. Editors ordered Wulfgar's resurrection in Passage to Dawn after the fans' request, despite Salvatore's argument. Later, though, Salvatore was quoted as saying "I'm really glad I brought Wulfgar back. When I was writing Spine of the World, I came to appreciate making something of what Wulfgar had gone through. When I wrote that book, I sent it to my editor and I said, 'Half the people are going to love this book, and the other half are going to hate it. It is what it is, and there's nothing I can do about it.'"

In Passage to Dawn, it was explained that yochlol dragged Wulfgar to the Abyss and its master Lolth, who later gave Wulfgar to the demon Errtu, so that the demon would watch over the drow city Menzoberranzan during the Time of Troubles. When Errtu was summoned by a wizard, he escaped and brought Wulfgar with him. He was tortured and humiliated in the hands of the demon. Drizzt and company defeated Errtu and sent him back to the Abyss, but during his time as Errtu's prisoner Wulfgar's mind was almost broken. He later wound up attacking Cattie-brie during a hallucination, an occurrence which caused him much mental anguish. In an effort to stop the harm he was doing, Wulfgar broke off from the Companions of the Hall, and wandered the North for a time, eventually finding himself at a tavern called the Cutlass, owned by Arumn Gardpeckk.

The Spine of the World portrays Wulfgar descending into alcoholism. The barbarian eventually became the bouncer of Arumn's bar and the lover of the barmaid Delly Curtie. Josi Puddles, Arumn's cowardly friend, stole Wulfgar's hammer, fearing that when Arumn decided to fire the huge barbarian, Wulfgar would use the hammer to tear down the bar. Wulfgar was then accused of the attempted murder of Captain Deudermont of the Sea Sprite, with whom he had sailed several years earlier. He was then taken to the Prisoners Carnival, a vicious show run by the Magistrate Jarkheld, where felons (even ones innocent of the crimes accused of) were tortured in various fashions until they admitted to the crimes accused of, so that they might be killed swiftly. Wulfgar and his friend, Morik the Rogue, who had been accused of the same crime, were pardoned by Captain Deudermont, and took to the road after being banished from the city and refusing to once again sail with the Captain. Wulfgar then for a short time tried to, without alcohol, shut out the memories of his time with Errtu, and the horrible tortures he had suffered with him. After an incident in the small fiefdom of Auckney, involving the young king's wife and a lie concocted to save her illegitimate child, Wulfgar and Morik left with a young child, and Wulfgar was finally able to banish his demons without alcohol, after being shown an act of massive courage by the king's wife when she had nothing to gain from the act. He and Morik then headed back to Luskan for a short time. After apologizing to Arumn for his destructive behavior, and to Delly for not returning her feelings, Wulfgar and Morik parted ways and he left Luskan with Delly and their unnamed child at his side.

In Sea of Swords, Wulfgar and Delly then traveled to Waterdeep, where Wulfgar took up with Captain Deudermont and the crew of the Sea Sprite in search of the pirate to whom Josie Puddles had sold his warhammer. After giving up his sea-based search, he travelled into the northlands in search of the pirate Sheila Kree. He eventually met up with his old friends, Drizzt and company, whom he had abandoned months earlier and who had thought him dead. With their help (and to a smaller degree Morik's, who had been sleeping with the female wizard of Sheila Kree's crew) he recovered his hammer, Aegis-fang, after facing an entire clan of ogres. Catti-brie then sunk Shelia Kree and her crew with her powerful bow, Taulmaril, as they tried to flee to the sea.

When Thibbledorf Pwent and the Gutbuster Brigade arrived, bearing news that Gandalug Battlehammer had died, Wulfgar and his family travelled with his old companions, and the entire clan of Icewind-Dale Battlehammer dwarves, to Mithral Hall so that Bruenor could resume his reign. Sometime afterward, Bruenor decided to look for another lost dwarven homeland called Gauntlgrym, and the dwarf's closest friends accompanied him, along with five hundred dwarves. On their trek through the Spine of the World, the caravan came upon the ruin of the small human settlement Clicking Heels, which had been sacked by a multitude of Orcs and Frost Giants. Later they picked up the only two survivors of an expedition from Citadel Felbarr, which had been similarly destroyed. Bruenor then determined that himself, Drizzt, Wulfgar, Catti-Brie, Regis, and a small detachment of dwarves, would see if other villages in the region had also been sacked. Wulfgar assured Delly that he would rejoin her at Mithral Hall after a short time.

During their trek, the group entered the small town of Shallows, a small (approximately 120 people and a local wizard) prosperous community. It was during this time, that while out on patrol, one of Shallows militia teams encountered a large force of Orcs and was slaughtered, with only one survivor managing to escape and hide. The lone survivor then sped back to Shallows and told of the Orc force. When the attack began on the town, Wulfgar was charged with holding an entire section of the towns defensive wall, with Regis, Bruenor and his dwarves, the towns militia holding the rest(Drizzt had been unable to get inside the walls before the assault began), while Withegroo the wizard and the towns archers (Catti-Brie among them) firing over the walls from the top of his tower in the center of the town. He performed admirably, holding the wall against the massive force of 1000 Orcs. Repelling grapplers and sweeping aside those few who crested the wall, Wulfgar was unmovable, even after countless hours when exhaustion began to set in. Unfortunately many townspeople still fell during the first assault, due to the 10 Frost Giants who tirelessly hurled boulders against their defenses. When the first assault ended, it left a third of Shallows defenders dead, and many more orcs. Unfortunately, after the last push by Bruenor and his dwarves to clear out the Orcs from in front of Shallows main gates, he fell unconscious, having sustained many blows that would have felled a lesser Dwarf. During this time, Regis left to try to make his way to one of the Dwarven outposts. When the attack began again, the defenders once again managed to hold their fortifications against the invasion. Unfortunately, Bruenor's second in command, Dagnabbit, fell before it even started, when a giant thrown boulder struck Withegroo's tower where he stood shouting commands to his forces, killing him and three other Dwarves. After the second assault was fended off, the towns walls lay in rubble and many more defenders had fallen, Wulfgar, Catti-Brie, Withegroo and their depleted forces emerged from the rubble and managed to stave off the last attack. After Withegroo cast his last fireball ever and killed many more orcs, Wulfgar stood unmovable against the sea of Orcs that swept against them, and continued to swing his hammer until the press lessened, leaving him and the defenders confused as to why it had stopped. A large wooden idol of Gruumsh One-Eye was then rolled in to the Orc encampment by a caravan of odd Orcs and pack animals. When the idol began to open the orcs crowded around, and were slaughtered by the emerging Gutbusters.. The orcs and pack animals then threw off their druid enchanted cloaks, revealing themselves as Regis, the Bouldershoulder brothers and a small force of Dwarves.

In The Two Swords, Delly fell under the powerful will of the sentient sword, Khazid' hea, and was slain by orcs. Townspeople took Colson, without telling Wulfgar. Wulfgar, grieving, is determined to find his adopted daughter.

Return to Icewind Dale
With the release of The Orc King, Wulfgar's quest to get his adopted daughter back continues. In the novel, he and Catti-Brie go to Silverymoon, trying to find Cottie, the woman who took Colson, and through Alustriel, they find that she and the girl had gone to Nesmé, where many refugees have gone to build new homes. After Cottie, who has lost everything dear to her, finally gives up Colson, Wulfgar finally tells Catti-Brie that he will be taking Colson back to her true mother, and that he will return to Icewind Dale, to become anew in his former tribal life. He says that he wants to find a wife and have a family, and that the comforts of Mithral Hall cannot keep his spirit contented. After returning Colson to her true mother in Auckney, Wulfgar returns to the frigid northlands of Icewind Dale, content in his decision.

In the novel Gauntlgrym, it is revealed that Wulfgar lived a very long and healthy life, having several children and grandchildren before he finally died. After his death, he was taken to a special heaven created by the goddess Meilikki, and rejoins Regis, Bruenor and Cattie-brie, but declines Meilikki's offer of a rebirth to instead rejoin his ancestors among the presence of Tempus.  It is revealed at the end of The Companions (the first book of the series The Sundering), however, that he changed his mind, and rejoins his old companions for the re-creation of the Companions of the Hall.  His story of rebirth and second life is not detailed.

Aegis-fang 

Aegis-fang (derived from the mythical shield Aegis) is the iconic weapon of Wulfgar, a mighty war hammer. It was forged for him by his adoptive father Bruenor Battlehammer while he was in servitude of the dwarf king. It was Bruenor's finest creation. Its head is made from pure Mithril with a diamond coating magically adhered during the forging and an adamantite shaft. Its head is engraved with the magical inscriptions of Clangeddin, the dwarven god of battle, as well as the symbols of Moradin, the dwarven god of creation, which covers the symbol of Dumathoin, "keeper of secrets under the mountain".

It is a large and heavy, perfectly balanced Dwarven war hammer +5. When thrown at any giant or giant-class monster, that monster is struck dead (although a powerful Frost Giant named Biggrin was able to take the hit, though it gashed the side of his head and dropped the fifteen-foot-tall giant to the floor). Any person not standing over 6'5" and with considerable strength will have a hard time wielding it properly, though even someone of lesser strength can feel the flawless balance. It is magically attuned to Wulfgar and will reappear in his hand upon command.

Wulfgar has been trained extensively by Drizzt Do'Urden with this weapon. He has used it in two battles against dragons, a shadow dragon named  Shimmergloom and a white dragon named Icingdeath, both times ending in victory. He also used it in a battle beside Drizzt Do'Urden and Bruenor Battlehammer against the balor, Errtu, again ending in victory for the companions.

In other media
Wulfgar appears in the Baldur's Gate II: Shadows of Amn computer role-playing game as minor NPC.

Wulfgar will appear in Dungeons & Dragons: Dark Alliance as one of the four playable characters.

He appears in the 2021 Magic: The Gathering expansion set Dungeons & Dragons: Adventures in the Forgotten Realms as a "Legendary Creature" card in the Draconic Rage commander deck.

Reception
In the Io9 series revisiting older Dungeons & Dragons novels, Rob Bricken commented that after capturing Wulfgar, Bruenor "does place the barbarian in indentured servitude for five years, by the end of that time Wulfgar is essentially his adopted son, to the point that Bruenor makes Wulfgar a super-badass magic battle hammer that returns to his hand when thrown (so at least Salvatore is doing Thor instead of LotR)." Bricken also noted that "Drizzt and Wulfgar are so preternaturally badass they beat 25 giants by themselves"."

According to Aidan-Paul Canavan, Wulfgar is one of the characters that "exemplify the strong, honest, hot-headed young warrior hero type common to adventure stories and similar to Howard’s creation Conan"."

Tanja Monique Bruske-Guth analyzes Wulfgar's development in relation to the use of violence: After his up-bringing as a barbarian the character simply takes the use of violence for granted. His actions are graphically described and also link his presentation in the novel to the role-playing game: Wulfgar counts the enemies he has killed, which has parallels in mythology, as well as to receiving experience points for vanquished foes in the game. She noted that his years of indentured service with the dwarves, and specifically Bruenor, shape Wulfgar physically and allow him to reflect on his earlier behavior and change his outlook: He will still fight, but decides to use violence "against evil", changing from a morally bad to a good character. This character development is facilitated by Wulfgar getting the named weapon Aegisfang. He thus follows a typical trope in fantasy described by Susanne van Clewe: The hero, here Wulfgar, receives a magical item that grants him sovereign power. At the same time it presents a test of character whether he can bear the responsibility that comes with it.

References

Fictional hammer fighters
Forgotten Realms characters
Literary characters introduced in 1988

pl:Lista postaci ze świata Forgotten Realms#Wulfgar